Lophiotoma dickkilburni is a species of sea snail, a marine gastropod mollusk in the family Turridae, the turrids.

Description

Distribution
This marine species occurs off Natal, South Africa, Southern Mozambique and Southern India.

References

 Olivera. 2004. Larger forms in Lophiotoma defined: Four new species described from the Philippines and three from elsewhere in the Indo-Pacific. Science Diliman, 16 (1) : 1-28

dickkilburni
Gastropods described in 2004